This list shows the government education expenditure of various countries in % of GDP (1989–2019).

References

Government budgets
Education lists by country
Education Spending